Tyson DeVree (born November 12, 1984) is a former American football tight end. He was signed by the New England Patriots as an undrafted free agent in 2008. He last played college football at Colorado.

He has also been a member of the Buffalo Bills, Hartford Colonials, Cleveland Browns, and Indianapolis Colts.

College career
DeVree attended the University of Colorado after transferring from Western Michigan following his sophomore year.

Professional career

New England Patriots
DeVree was signed by the Patriots as an undrafted free agent on May 5, 2008, but was waived by the team on June 11. He was re-signed on August 19 and waived again on August 30 during final cuts.

DeVree was re-signed to the team's practice squad on September 1, released on September 4, and re-signed to the practice squad on September 17. He was promoted to the Patriots' active roster on November 17 after cornerback Terrence Wheatley was placed on injured reserve. He played in two regular season games and did not record a catch in either.

DeVree was waived by the Patriots on August 23, 2009.

Buffalo Bills
DeVree signed with the Buffalo Bills on September 1, 2009, but was released four days later, during final cuts.

Cleveland Browns
DeVree was signed to the Browns practice squad on December 7, 2010. He was waived on July 28, 2011.

Indianapolis Colts
DeVree was claimed off waivers on July 31, 2011 by the Indianapolis Colts.

References

External links
Colorado Buffaloes bio
New England Patriots bio
Just Sports Stats

1984 births
Living people
People from Hudsonville, Michigan
Players of American football from Michigan
American football tight ends
Western Michigan Broncos football players
Colorado Buffaloes football players
New England Patriots players
Buffalo Bills players
Hartford Colonials players
Cleveland Browns players